Club Deportivo Madridejos is a football club based in Madridejos, Castile-La Mancha, Spain. Founded in 1968, the team plays in Tercera División Group 18. The club's home ground is Nuevo Estadio, with a 2,000-seat capacity.

Season to season

13 seasons in Tercera División

Notable players
 Soumaïla Konaré

References

External links
Official website 
Castile-La Mancha Football Federation
Futbolme team profile 

Football clubs in Castilla–La Mancha
Association football clubs established in 1968
1968 establishments in Spain
Province of Toledo